SM UB-36 was a German Type UB II submarine or U-boat in the German Imperial Navy during World War I. The U-boat was ordered on 22 July 1915 and launched on 15 January 1916. She was commissioned into the German Imperial Navy on 22 May 1916 as SM UB-36.

The submarine sank seven ships in twelve patrols. She herself was sunk in May 1917, but her fate is a matter of dispute. Some sources claim that UB-36 was rammed and presumably sunk by the French steamer  in the English Channel off Ushant, France, on 21 May 1917.

Design
A German Type UB II submarine, UB-36 had a displacement of  when at the surface and  while submerged. The submarine was powered by two Körting six-cylinder diesel engines producing a total , two Siemens-Schuckert electric motors producing , and one propeller shaft.

UB-36 was fitted with two  torpedo tubes, four torpedoes, and one  Uk L/30 deck gun. She had a complement of twenty-one crew members and two officers and a 42-second dive time.

Summary of raiding history

References

Notes

Citations

Bibliography

External links

1916 ships
Ships built in Hamburg
World War I submarines of Germany
German Type UB II submarines
U-boats commissioned in 1916
U-boats sunk in 1917
U-boats sunk by surface craft
World War I shipwrecks in the English Channel
Ships lost with all hands
U-boats sunk in collisions
U-boats sunk by mines